James Byrd Jr. (May 2, 1949 – June 7, 1998) was a black American man who was murdered by three white men, two of whom were avowed white supremacists, in Jasper, Texas, on June 7, 1998. Shawn Berry, Lawrence Brewer, and John King dragged him for  behind a Ford pickup truck along an asphalt road. Byrd, who remained conscious for much of his ordeal, was killed about halfway through the dragging when his body hit the edge of a culvert, severing his right arm and head. The murderers drove on for another  before dumping his torso in front of a black church.

Brewer and King were the first white men to be sentenced to death for killing a black person in the history of modern Texas. In 2001, Byrd's lynching-by-dragging led the state of Texas to pass a hate crimes law, which later led the Congress to pass the Matthew Shepard and James Byrd Jr. Hate Crimes Prevention Act, commonly known as the Matthew Shepard Act, in 2009. Brewer was executed by lethal injection for his part in the murder on September 21, 2011. King was executed by lethal injection at the state penitentiary in Huntsville, Texas, on April 24, 2019. Berry was sentenced to life imprisonment and will be eligible for parole in 2038.

Background
James Byrd Jr. was born on May 2, 1949, in Jasper County, Texas, the third of nine children, to Stella Mae Sharp (1925–2010) and James Byrd Sr. (1925–2020). His mother was a Sunday School teacher and his father was a deacon at the Greater New Bethel Church. Byrd graduated from Jasper Rowe High School in 1967, the last segregated class. After graduating from high school, he married and had three children: Renee, Ross, and Jamie. He worked as a vacuum salesman. James Byrd Jr. was a cousin of Dennetta Lyles King who was Rodney King's first wife and mother to his daughter Lora King.

Ross Byrd, the only son of James Byrd Jr., has been involved with "Murder Victims' Families for Reconciliation", an organization that opposes capital punishment. He campaigned to spare the lives of those who murdered his father and appeared briefly in the documentary Deadline.

Murder
On June 7, 1998, Byrd, age 49, accepted a ride from Shawn Berry (age 23), Lawrence Brewer (age 31), and John King (age 23). Berry, who was driving, was acquainted with Byrd from around town. Brewer later claimed that Byrd's throat had been slashed by Berry before he was dragged. However, forensic evidence suggests that Byrd had been attempting to keep his head up while being dragged, and an autopsy suggested that Byrd was alive during much of the dragging. Byrd died about halfway along the route of his dragging, when his right arm and head were severed as his body hit a culvert. While almost all of Byrd's ribs were fractured, his brain and skull were found intact, further suggesting that he maintained consciousness while he was being dragged.

Berry, Brewer, and King dumped the mutilated remains of Byrd's body in front of an African-American church on Huff Creek Road, then drove off to a barbecue. A motorist found Byrd's decapitated remains the following morning. Along the area where Byrd was dragged, police found a wrench with "Berry" written on it. They also found a lighter that was inscribed with "Possum", which was King's prison nickname. The police found 81 places that included portions of Byrd's remains. Since Brewer and King were well-known white supremacists, it was determined by state law enforcement officials that the murder was a hate crime. They called upon the Federal Bureau of Investigation less than 24 hours after the discovery of Byrd's remains. The special agent in charge of the FBI's Houston office said that they were assisting because of the case's "extreme circumstances".

King had several racist tattoos: a black man hanging from a tree, Nazi symbols, the words "Aryan Pride", and the patch for a gang of white supremacist inmates known as the Confederate Knights of America. In a jailhouse letter to Brewer that was intercepted by jail officials, King expressed pride in the crime and said that he realized while committing the murder that he might have to die. "Regardless of the outcome of this, we have made history. Death before dishonor. Sieg Heil!" King wrote. An officer investigating the case also testified that witnesses said that King had referenced The Turner Diaries after beating Byrd.

Berry, Brewer, and King were tried and convicted for Byrd's murder. Brewer and King received the death penalty, while Berry was sentenced to life in prison. Brewer was executed by lethal injection on September 21, 2011, and King was executed on April 24, 2019.

Perpetrators

Shawn Berry

During the trial of Shawn Allen Berry (born February 12, 1975), the prosecution conceded that he was not a white supremacist, but they argued that he was just as responsible for Byrd's murder as the other men and suggested that he might have been a thrill killer. Berry's attorneys had three black men who knew him testify that he was not a racist. Berry claimed that Brewer and King were almost entirely responsible for the crime. He said he tried to stop them from attacking Byrd until Brewer threatened to do the same to him. Brewer, however, testified that Berry had cut Byrd's throat before he was tied to the truck. The jury decided that minimal evidence supported this claim. Berry was also the only one of the three to show any degree of remorse. As a result, Berry was spared execution and instead sentenced to life in prison. , Berry was living in protective custody at the Texas Department of Criminal Justice's Ramsey Unit, and will be first eligible for parole when he is 63 years old in June 2038. He spends 23 hours per day in an  cell, with one hour for exercise. Berry married Christie Marcontell by proxy.

Lawrence Brewer

Lawrence Russell Brewer (March 13, 1967 – September 21, 2011) was a white supremacist, who prior to Byrd's murder had served a prison sentence for drug possession and burglary. He was paroled in 1991. After violating his parole conditions in 1994, Brewer was returned to prison. According to his court testimony, he joined a white supremacist prison gang with King in order to safeguard himself from other inmates. Brewer and King became friends in the Beto Unit prison. A psychiatrist testified that Brewer did not appear repentant for his crimes. During the trial, the prosecution labeled him a racist psychopath. Brewer was ultimately convicted and sentenced to death. Brewer, TDCJ#999327, was on death row at the Polunsky Unit, but he was executed in the Huntsville Unit on September 21, 2011. The day before his execution, Brewer expressed no remorse for his crime, as he told KHOU 11 News in Houston: "As far as any regrets, no, I have no regrets. No, I'd do it all over again, to tell you the truth."

Before his execution, Brewer ordered a last meal that prompted the end of last meal requests in Texas. The meal included two chicken fried steaks with gravy and sliced onions; a triple-patty bacon cheeseburger; a cheese omelet with ground beef, tomatoes, onions, bell peppers and jalapeños; a bowl of fried okra with ketchup; one pound of barbecued meat with half a loaf of white bread; three fully loaded fajitas; a meat-lover's pizza; one pint of Blue Bell vanilla ice cream; a slab of peanut-butter fudge with crushed peanuts on top; and three root beers. When the meal was presented, he told officials that he was not hungry and as a result he did not eat any of it. The meal was discarded, prompting State Senator John Whitmire to ask Texas prison officials to end the 87-year-old tradition of giving last meals to condemned inmates. The prison agency's executive director responded by stating that the practice had been terminated effective immediately.

John King

John William "Bill" King (November 3, 1974 – April 24, 2019) was Berry's longtime friend. He was accused of beating Byrd with a bat and then dragging him behind a pickup truck until he died. King, who prior to the murder had recently been released from a Texas prison, said that he had been repeatedly gang raped in prison by black inmates. He was found guilty and sentenced to death for his role in Byrd's kidnapping and murder, and was on death row at the Polunsky Unit.

On December 21, 2018, King's execution by lethal injection was scheduled for April 24, 2019. On April 22, 2019, his appeals to both the Texas Court of Criminal Appeals and the Texas Board of Pardons and Paroles were denied. He was executed at the Huntsville Unit on April 24, 2019.

Reactions
Numerous aspects of the Byrd murder echo lynching traditions that were common in the post-Civil War south. These include mutilation or decapitation and revelry, such as a barbecue or a picnic, either during or after a lynching. Byrd's murder was strongly condemned by Jesse Jackson and the Martin Luther King Center as an act of vicious racism, and it also focused national attention on the prevalence of white supremacist prison gangs.

Three sisters of James Byrd are Jehovah's Witnesses, and in a joint statement said: "Having a loved one tortured and lynched produced an unimaginable sense of loss and pain. How does one respond to such a brutal act? Retaliation, hateful speech, or promotion of hate-ridden propaganda never entered our mind. We thought: 'What would Jesus have done? How would he have responded?' The answer was crystal clear. His message would have been one of peace and hope."

The victim's family created the James Byrd Foundation for Racial Healing after his death. Basketball star Dennis Rodman paid their funeral expenses and gave Byrd's family $25,000. Fight promoter Don King gave Byrd's children $100,000 to be put towards their educational expenses.

On October 7, 1998, an episode of Law & Order titled "DWB" (driving while black) referenced the murder within the plot. Instead of three white supremacists, however, the killers were three white New York City police officers. As the plot goes, the officers stop and arrest a black man for no reason, and then proceed to drag him to his death, after tying him to the car.

In 1999, the documentary Journey to a Hate Free Millennium was created, showcasing three United States hate crimes, including the shootings at Columbine High School; the death of a gay student, Matthew Shepard; and the execution of James Byrd Jr. The documentary won over 100 film and educational awards and has been used in schools all over the world as a means to stop hate.

In 2003, a movie about the crime, titled Jasper, Texas, was produced and aired on Showtime. The same year, a documentary titled Two Towns of Jasper, made by filmmakers Marco Williams and Whitney Dow, premiered on PBS's P.O.V. series.

While employed as a radio DJ at station WARW in Washington, DC, Doug Tracht (also known as the "Greaseman") made a derogatory comment referring to James Byrd after playing Lauryn Hill's song "Doo Wop (That Thing)". The February 1999 incident proved catastrophic to Tracht's radio career, igniting protests from black and white listeners alike. He was quickly fired from WARW and lost his position as a volunteer deputy sheriff in Falls Church, Virginia.

In May 2004, two white teens, Joshua Lee Talley and John Matthew Fowler, were arrested and charged with criminal mischief for desecrating James Byrd Jr.'s grave with racial slurs and profanities.

Impact on US politics
Some advocacy groups, such as the NAACP National Voter Fund, made an issue of this case during George W. Bush's presidential campaign in 2000. They accused Bush of implicit racism, since as governor of Texas, he opposed hate-crime legislation. Also, citing a prior commitment, Bush did not appear at Byrd's funeral. Because two of the three murderers were sentenced to death and the third murderer was sentenced to life in prison (all three of them were charged with and convicted of capital murder, the highest felony level in Texas), Governor Bush maintained, "we don't need tougher laws". The 77th Texas Legislature passed the James Byrd Jr. Hate Crimes Act. With the signature of Governor Rick Perry, who inherited the balance of Bush's unexpired term, the act became Texas state law in 2001. In 2009, the Matthew Shepard and James Byrd Jr. Hate Crimes Prevention Act expanded the 1969 United States federal hate-crime law to include crimes which are motivated by a victim's actual or perceived gender, sexual orientation, gender identity, or disability.

Musical and poetry tributes
On the 2001 album Pieces of Me by singer-songwriter Lori McKenna, the song "Pink Sweater" is dedicated to Byrd; it condemns his murderers and references their death-penalty convictions with the raucous refrain, "I'll be the one in the pink sweater, dancing around when you're gone." In 2010, Alabama musician Matthew Mayfield wrote, recorded, and released a song in Byrd's honor. The tune, titled "Still Alive", is the fourth track on Mayfield's EP You're Not Home. "Still Alive" clearly related a stark bitterness towards racism and equated such hate crimes with genocide. "Tell Me Why", featuring Mary J. Blige, mentions Byrd on Will Smith's fourth album, Lost and Found. Byrd's son Ross recorded the rap album Undeniable Resurrection and dedicated it to his father.

"Jasper", by Confrontation Camp, is the fifth track on the album Objects in the Mirror Are Closer Than They Appear (2000). "Guitar Drag" by sound artist Christian Marclay is a video- and sound-installation about the murder of James Byrd (2000). "I Heard 'Em Say" by Ryan Bingham is about Byrd's murder and the racially charged climate around Jasper following the crime (2012).

Byrd's murder is the subject of Maryland poet laureate Lucille Clifton's piece "jasper texas 1998" as well as Jeffrey Thomson's piece "Achilles in Jasper, Texas".

The tale of Byrd's murder, and that of Matthew Shepard, are told in a verse of the song "Trouble the Waters" by Big Country on their album Driving to Damascus (named John Wayne's Dream in its US release).

Byrd's murder is depicted in Nia DaCosta's 2021 film Candyman, featuring him resurrected as one of the souls trapped in the Candyman "hive": in his Candyman form, with his skull exposed, Byrd uses the hook and cables involved in his murder to kill his murderers, ascending into legend. Depicted in the film's mid-credits scene in the form of shadow puppetry, Byrd's murder was previously featured in DaCosta's 2020 promotional short film of the same name.

See also

References

Further reading

 
 Ainslie, Ricardo. Long Dark Road: Bill King and Murder in Jasper, Texas. University of Texas Press, 2004.
 King, Joyce. Hate Crime: The Story of a Dragging in Jasper, Texas. Pantheon, 2002.
 Temple-Raston, Dina. A Death in Texas: A Story of Race, Murder, and Small Town's Struggle for Redemption. Henry Holt and Co., January 6, 2002.

External links
 Remember His Name – From Hate To Healing: The Long Road Home documentary in production by Lizard Productions
 
  – television movie
 NAACP National Voter Fund – Campaign ads 2000

1998 in Texas
1998 murders in the United States
African-American history of Texas
Capital murder cases
Deaths by person in Texas
June 1998 crimes
June 1998 events in the United States
Lynching deaths in Texas
Murders by motor vehicle
Racially motivated violence against African Americans
People or corpses dragged behind a vehicle